NA-171 Rahim Yar Khan-III is a constituency for the National Assembly of Pakistan.

Election 2002 

General elections were held on 10 Oct 2002. Makhdoom Khusro Bakhtiar of PML-Q won by 70,116 votes.

Election 2008 

General elections were held on 18 Feb 2008. Makhdoom Shahabuddin of PPP won by 59,710 votes.

Election 2013 

General elections were held on 11 May 2013. Makhdoom Khusro Bakhtyar of PML-N won by 87,433 votes and became the  member of National Assembly.

Election 2018 

General elections are scheduled to be held on 25 July 2018.

By-election 2023 
A by-election will be held on 19 March 2023 due to the resignation of Khusro Bakhtiar, the previous MNA from this seat.

See also
NA-170 Rahim Yar Khan-II
NA-172 Rahim Yar Khan-IV

References

External links 
Election result's official website

NA-194